Lønstrup Mølle is a former smock mill in Lønstrup on the west coast of North Jutlandic Island in the north-west of Denmark. It was decommissioned in the beginning of the 20th century and has been converted into a private home. The sails broke off in the 1990s.

See also
List of windmills in Denmark

References

Smock mills in Denmark
Buildings and structures in Hjørring Municipality
Octagonal buildings in Denmark